Wyoming Highway 173 (WYO 173) is a short  Wyoming state road located in  Hot Springs County south of Thermopolis.

Route description

Wyoming Highway 173 begins its west end at US 20/WYO 789 just over a mile and a half south of Thermopolis. Named Buffalo Creek Road, Highway 173 travels southeasterly along the south bank of the Bighorn River. At 1.42 miles, WYO 173 crosses the river via the CQA Four Mile Bridge which is listed on the U.S. National Register of Historic Places as one of forty bridges throughout Wyoming that illustrate steel truss construction. Two-tenths of a mile later WYO 173 reaches its end at County Route 31 (South Yellowstone Road). CR 31 continues another 1.6 miles south and returns to US 20/WYO 789.

Major intersections

See also

References

External links 

Wyoming State Routes 100-199
WYO 173 - US 20/WYO 789 to Hot Springs CR 31

Transportation in Hot Springs County, Wyoming
173